Mysteriomorphus is an extinct genus of beetle, and the only member of the family Mysteriomorphidae. It is known from one described species, Mysteriomorphus pelevini found in Burmese amber, dating to the early part of the Cenomanian stage of the Late Cretaceous but more species are likely due to the morphological diversity of known specimens. It was initially placed in Elateriformia incertae sedis, but a subsequent study found that it was better placed within the Elateroidea, close to Elateridae.

References

Burmese amber
†
Prehistoric beetle genera